The NBB All-Star Game is an annual game involving the All-Star players of each season of the Novo Basquete Brasil (New Basketball Brazil), which is the top-tier level Brazilian professional club basketball league. The players are chosen by votes on the Internet, and are then divided into two teams. The criterion for the selection of the teams has varied during the years. In the first edition of the NBB All-Star Game, the teams were divided into team Ubiratan, with light jerseys, and formed by the best players of each position; and team Rosa Branca, with dark jerseys, and formed by the second top players in each position. In the second edition, they were chosen by votes on the Internet, and divided into team Pedroca and team Kanela. In the third and fourth editions, the teams were selected in the same way, but formed into team NBB Brasil (NBB Brazil), formed by the best Brazilian players of the season, and team NBB Mundo (NBB World), formed by the best foreign players of the season.

NBB All-Star Weekend

The NBB All-Star Weekend is an annual event involving the All-star players of each season of the Novo Basquete Brasil (New Basketball Brazil), which is the top-tier level Brazilian professional club basketball league. This event features the NBB Dunks Tournament and the NBB Three-point Tournament (both featured since the first edition of the All-Star Weekend), and the NBB Skills Challenge (featured since the 2011 edition).

NBB All-Star Games

Original format

NBB Brasil (NBB Brazil) versus NBB Mundo (NBB World)

2009 season

Roster

Game

2009–10 season

Roster

Game

2010–11 season

Roster

''INJ' (injury) refers to a player who is out of play due to injury..
'SUB' (substitute) is the player who enters the place that hurt.

Game

2011–12 season

Roster

 'INJ' (injury) refers to a player who is out of the game due to injury.
 'SUB' (substitute) is the player who enters the place that got hurt.
 The player Rashad Bishop did not participate in the game due to his team being in Puerto Rico to compete in the FIBA Americas League.
 'STA' (starter), the player was selected as a starter in place of the player who did not attend the game.

Game

2012–13 season

Roster

 Will not participate due to injury.
 Tyrone Curnell was named Jeff Agba's replacement.
 DeAndre Coleman to start in place of the injured Jeff Agba
 Will not participate due to injury.
 Jefferson William was named Jeff Agba's replacement.
 Caio Torres to start in place of the injured Guilherme Giovannoni

Game

2013–14 season

2014–15 season

Players with most appearances

References

External links
Official website 
New Basketball Brazil at Latinbasket.com

Novo Basquete Brasil
Basketball all-star games